Serruelles is a commune in the Cher department in the Centre-Val de Loire region of France.

Geography
A very small farming and forestry village situated about south of Bourges, at the junction of the D940 with the D130 road.

Population

Sights
 The church of St. Ursin, dating from the eleventh century.
 The seventeenth-century manorhouse of Lambussey.

See also
Communes of the Cher department

References

External links

Annuaire-Mairie website 

Communes of Cher (department)